The Two Republics was an English-language newspaper published in Mexico City from 1867 to 1900.

See also
 Mexican Herald

References
 

Defunct newspapers published in Mexico
English-language newspapers published in North America
Newspapers published in Mexico City